Host Planet Earth was a BBC radio serial consisting of six half-hour episodes which were originally broadcast on the Light Programme between July and September 1967. Electronic sound and music was by the Clive Webster of the BBC Radiophonic Workshop.

It detailed the course of a strange disease which first affects scientists working on a British rocketry programme. When British astronauts fall prey to the sickness in space, can they be allowed to return?

Episodes
 "The Beginning"
 "The Empty Minds"
 "The Pattern Emerges"
 "The Gemini Factor"
 "The Arrival"
 "The Price of Freedom"

With:
 "Claire Stewart"         - Brenda Bruce
 "Professor Ormskirk"     - Clive Morton
 "David Holland"          - Alexander John
 "Nat Blakey"             - Nigel Anthony
 "Bill Cape"              - Ian Thompson
 "Rathbone"               - Timothy Bateson
 "Joseph Banks"           - Peter Tuddenham
 "Mrs Hemming"            - Betty Hardy
 "Rosemary Manning"       - Barbara Mitchell
 "Technician"             - Preston Lockwood
 Written by               - Anne Howell & Colin Cooper
 Produced by              - Nesta Pain
 Music by                 - Clive Webster, BBC Radiophonic Workshop

References

British science fiction radio programmes